Mirkovac is a settlement in the region of Baranja, Croatia. Administratively, it is located in the Kneževi Vinogradi municipality within the Osijek-Baranja County. Population is 135 people.

Ethnic groups (2001 census)
Croats = 118
Serbs = 10
Hungarians = 5
others = 2

See also
Osijek-Baranja county
Baranja

References 

Kneževi Vinogradi